He-Man and the Masters of the Universe (often referred to simply as He-Man) is an American animated television series produced by Filmation based on Mattel's toy line Masters of the Universe. The show was one of the most popular animated shows of the 1980s.
 
It made its television debut in September 1983 and ran until 1985, consisting of two seasons of 65 episodes each. Towards the end of the show's original run, it spawned one feature length theatrical movie He-Man and She-Ra: The Secret of the Sword, which served as the introduction for the show's spinoff literal sister series She-Ra: Princess of Power. Reruns continued to air in syndication until 1988, at which point USA Network bought the rights to the series. USA aired He-Man until September 1990. The success of the toy based show in syndication greatly influenced other animation houses to produce half hour "cartoon commercials", and considerably changed the syndicated cartoon market.

The franchise has been adapted many times in comic book and comic strip form, and a live-action film was produced in 1987. A rebooted series, He-Man and the Masters of the Universe, renamed Masters of the Universe vs. The Snake Men during season 2, released on Toonami on August 16, 2002. Two continuation series were released in 2021 for Netflix: one is Masters of the Universe: Revelation for an adult audience and another is a family-oriented animated CGI revival, also titled He-Man and the Masters of the Universe.

Synopsis
The series takes place on Eternia, a planet of magic, myth and fantasy. Its lead character is Prince Adam, the young son of Eternia's rulers, King Randor and Queen Marlena. Whenever Prince Adam holds the Sword of Power aloft and proclaims "By the Power of Grayskull!" he is endowed with "fabulous secret powers" and transformed into He-Man, the most powerful man in the universe. Together with his close allies, Battle Cat (who undergoes a similar transformation from being Adam's cowardly pet tiger Cringer), The Sorceress, Teela, Man-At-Arms and Orko, He-Man uses his powers to defend Eternia from the evil forces of Skeletor. Skeletor's main goal is to conquer the mysterious fortress of Castle Grayskull, from which He-Man draws his powers. If successful, Skeletor would have enough power to rule all of Eternia and possibly the entire universe.

Characters

Episodes

Production history
The Mattel company released the original He-Man action figure in 1982; the franchise backstory was developed by the Filmation animation studio. On 1 December 1982, Michael Halperin wrote a "series bible". Some time after, both firms pitched the idea to the ABC network, who turned it down. The resulting series, He-Man and the Masters of the Universe, debuted through barter syndication in September 1983, and became the first syndicated show to be based on a toy. By 1984, it was seen on 120 U.S. stations and in more than 30 countries. By mid-1985, it was airing on 152 stations across the U.S., and was the most popular syndicated program with children 2-11 with a 10.9 rating in that demographic.

Despite the limited animation techniques that were used to produce the series, He-Man was notable for breaking the boundaries of censorship that had severely restricted the narrative scope of children's TV programming in the 1970s. For the first time since Ruby-Spears's Thundarr the Barbarian, a cartoon series could feature a muscular superhero who was actually allowed to hit people (although he more typically used wrestling-style moves rather than actually punching enemies), though he still could not use his sword often; more often than not He-Man opted to pick up his opponents and toss them away rather than hit them. The cartoon was controversial in that it was produced in connection with marketing a line of toys; advertising to children was itself controversial during this period. In the United Kingdom, advertising regulations forbade commercials for He-Man toys to accompany the program itself. In similar fashion to other shows at the time, notably G.I. Joe, an attempt to mitigate the negative publicity generated by this controversy was made by including a "life lesson" or "moral of the story" at the end of each episode. This moral was usually directly tied to the action or central theme of that episode.
 
The show was so successful that it spawned a spin-off series, She-Ra: Princess of Power, following the adventures of He-Man's sister, Princess Adora. Mattel's subsequent attempts to relaunch the He-Man toy line also led to the short-lived sequel series The New Adventures of He-Man in the early 1990s, and an update of the franchise for a contemporary audience in 2002.

It is also noted for featuring early script-writing work from J. Michael Straczynski, later the creator of Babylon 5; Paul Dini and Brynne Stephens, both of whom who would go on to write acclaimed episodes of Batman: The Animated Series; Beast Wars story editor Larry DiTillio; and David Wise, later the head-writer of the TV version of Teenage Mutant Ninja Turtles and The Real Ghostbusters. In 2016, a new episode of He-Man was released.

Cast
 John Erwin as Prince Adam / He-Man, Ram-Man, Beast Man, Faker, Webstor, Whiplash, Granamyr and others
 Alan Oppenheimer as Skeletor, Cringer / Battle Cat, Man-At-Arms, Mer-Man, Buzz-Off, Roboto and others
 Lou Scheimer (credited as Erik Gunden) as Orko, King Randor, Stratos, Man-E-Faces, Mekaneck, Zodac, Fisto, Sy-Klone, Moss-Man, Lizard Man, Trap Jaw, Tri-Klops, Kobra Khan, Clawful, Jitsu, Spikor, Two Bad, Modulok and others
 Linda Gary as Teela, Evil-Lyn, Queen Marlena, Sorceress of Castle Grayskull and others
 George DiCenzo as various male guest voices (uncredited)
 Erika Scheimer as various female guest voices

Music
The series' music was composed by Shuki Levy and Haim Saban. The opening theme, snippets of which are used whenever Prince Adam transforms into He-Man and during interludes, is in C Mixolydian.

In 1984, a soundtrack album was released in France and Argentina by CBS Records and reissued on compact disc by XIII Bis in 2012, featuring music from the series and an adaptation of "A Friend in Need" (French release)/"Diamond Ray of Disappearance" (Argentine release); La-La Land Records released a two-disc, limited-edition soundtrack album in 2015, containing the musical content of the 1983 LP and much previously unreleased material.

The Latin American Spanish-language version of the show features an actual theme song complete with lyrics unique to this version, with vocals by Chilean singer Memo Aguirre (a.k.a. "Captain Memo") based on Levy and Saban's original musical score.

In 1986, Brazilian children’s music group Trem da Alegria recorded a song about He-Man.

Reception
He-Man and the Masters of the Universe is considered the most successful animated series ever made by Filmation. The show, as it was created to promote hyper-consumerism in children, left itself vulnerable to criticism. Many parent groups were also critical of what they saw as the show's homoeroticism. In 2009, IGN ranked the series as the 58th greatest animated show of all time in their Top 100 list.

Name in other languages

 In Basque "He-Man eta Unibertsoko Jaunak"
 In Bosnian "He-Man i Gospodari svemira" ("Хи-Мен и Господари свемира")
 In Catalan "He-Man i els Senyors de l'Univers"
 In Chinese "太空超人"
 In Croatian "He-Man i Gospodari svemira"
 In Danish "Heman Og Førerne Af Universet"
 In Dutch "He-Man, en de meesters van het Universum"
 In Finnish "He-Man ja Maailmankaikkeuden Valtiaat" 
 In French "Musclor et les Maîtres de l'Univers"
 In Galician "He-Man e os Amos do Universo"
 In German 
 "He-Man und Masters of the Universe" (TV Version 1992)
 "He-Man und die Meister des Universums" (VHS Version)
 "He-Man – Im Tal der Macht" (TV Version 2002)
 In Greek "Χι-Μαν Οι Κυριάρχοι Του Σύμπαντος"
 In Hungarian Lovag és az univerzum védelmezői.
 In Hebrew "הי-מן ושליטי היקום"
 In Italian 
 "He-Man e i dominatori dell'universo" (Season 1)
 "He-Man e i padroni dell'universo" (Season 2)
 In Macedonian "Hi-Men i Gospodarite na vselenata" ("Хи-Мен и Господарите на вселената")
 In Montenegrin "Hi-Men i Gospodari svemira" ("Хи-Мен и Господари свемира")
 In Norwegian "He-Man og mestere i universet"
 In Polish "He-Man i Władcy Wszechświata" 
 In Portuguese 
 "He-Man e os Defensores do Universo"
 "He-Man e os Mestres do Universo" (Brazil)
 "He-Man e os Donos do Universo" (Portugal)
 In Romanian "He-Man și maeștrii universului"
 In Russian "Hi-Men i Vlasteliny Vselennoy" ("Хи-Мен и Властелины Вселенной")
 In Serbian "Hi-Men i Gospodari svemira" ("Хи-Мен и Господари свемира")
 In Slovene "He-Man in Gospodarji vesolja"
 In Spanish
 "He-Man y los Amos del Universo" (Latin America)
 "He-Man y los Masters del Universo" (Spain)
 In Swedish "He-Man och Universums Giganter"
 In Thai "ฮีแมน จ้าวจักรวาล" 
 In Turkish "He-Man ve Evrenin Efendileri"
 In Ukrainian "Хі-Мен та Володарі Всесвіту"

Home media
In 1983-1986 RCA/Columbia Pictures Home Video released the series in VHS and Beta. BCI Eclipse LLC (under its Ink & Paint classic animation entertainment label) (under license from Entertainment Rights) released all 130 episodes of the original 1983 series of He-Man and the Masters of the Universe on DVD in Region 1 in 2005/2006, in 4 volume sets. Each episode on BCI Ink & Paint's He-Man and the Masters of the Universe DVD releases were uncut, unedited, fully restored and digitally remastered for optimum audio and video quality and presented in its original broadcast presentation and story continuity order. Each volume contains an extensive array of special features including documentaries, character profiles, commentaries, DVD-ROM features, trivia, photo galleries and more. As of 2009, these releases have been discontinued and are out of print as BCI Eclipse ceased operations.

On December 10, 2010, Mill Creek Entertainment announced that they had acquired the rights from Classic Media to re-release the series on DVD in America. They have subsequently re-released the complete first season in one eight-disc set as well as two smaller 20-episode volume releases. The complete second season was released on September 13, 2011. The 2002 series, composed of four discs; 960min, was also released in 2010 by Mill Creek Entertainment, and is titled Masters of the Universe: The Complete Series (ASIN B002DQL34G). Commemorating the 30th anniversary Masters of the Universe brand, Mill Creek Entertainment finally released the 30th Anniversary Commemorative Collection of the Masters of the Universe DVD. The 22-disc set features all 130 episodes of the 1983 series, 20 fan-favorite episodes of the 1990 series, as well as all 39 episodes of the 2002 series.

Universal Pictures Home Entertainment released all 130 episodes of the original 1983 He-Man and the Masters of the Universe series on DVD in Region 1 on October 1, 2019, as He-Man and the Masters of the Universe: The Complete Original Series. This release includes "He-Man & She-Ra: The Secret of the Sword" and "He-Man & She-Ra: A Christmas Special".

In Region 4, Madman Entertainment released the entire series on DVD in Australia in 4 volume sets (similar to BCI Eclipse releases). These releases have been discontinued and are now out of print. A complete series box set was released by Madman on June 24, 2009; this is still available.

The pilot episode, "Diamond Ray of Disappearance", has a minute or so of footage missing due to the master tapes being damaged. In the original version, after teleporting the King and Queen and Man-At-Arms away to another dimension, Skeletor turns the ray onto Orko, who gets stuck inside a vase which deflects the beam. Orko escapes to warn He-Man. This footage has not been lost; it is still existent on other media in circulation. However, complications over the rights to it prevented it from being inserted back into the DVD release.

Sequel

An adult Netflix Original series Masters of the Universe: Revelation, was released in 2021. Although initially announced as a direct sequel to the 1983 TV series, director Kevin Smith later admitted the series is not set in the same continuity as the original, but described it as a 'spiritual sequel' to the Filmation series. 

Revelation was directed by Kevin Smith and animated by Powerhouse Animation Studios. The series aired for 10 episodes, split between two "parts". A sequel series, Masters of the Universe: Revolution, is in development.

Notes

References

External links

He-Man and the Masters of the Universe at Don Markstein's Toonopedia. Archived from the original on January 27, 2016.

1983 American television series debuts
1985 American television series endings
1980s American animated television series
1980s American science fiction television series
American children's animated action television series
American children's animated space adventure television series
American children's animated science fantasy television series
American children's animated superhero television series
First-run syndicated television programs in the United States
Masters of the Universe television series
English-language television shows
Action figures
Television series about shapeshifting
Television shows based on Mattel toys
Television series set on fictional planets
Television series by Filmation
Television series by Universal Television
Television series by Mattel Creations
Westinghouse Broadcasting